Ziama Mansouriah  is a town and commune in Jijel Province, Algeria. According to the 2008 census it has a population of 12,642.

History 
In Roman times, the Ancient city was called Cova and belonged to the Roman province of Mauretania Sitifensis.
 
It was important enough to become a suffragan bishopric. Bishop Maximus of Cova was one of the Catholic bishops whom the Arian Vandal king Huneric summoned to Carthage in 484 and then exiled.

Titular see of Cova 
No longer a residential bishopric, Cova is today listed by the Catholic Church as a titular see.

The ancient diocese was nominally restored in 1933 as a titular bishopric, the lowest class, and since had the following near-consecutive incumbents :
 Emmanuel Otteh (1990.06.11 – 1996.11.08)
 José Luis Chávez Botello (1997.02.21 – 2001.07.16), later Metropolitan Archbishop of  Antequera (Mexico) 
 Joe S. Vásquez (2001.11.30 – 2010.01.26, as Auxiliary Bishop of Galveston–Houston), later Bishop of Austin (also in Texas, USA 2010.01.26 – ...)
 J. Douglas Deshotel, Auxiliary Bishop of Dallas (2010.03.11 – 2016.02.17), named Bishop of the Roman Catholic Diocese of Lafayette in Louisiana by Pope Francis 
 Neil Edward Tiedemann (2016.4.29 - Present)  Auxiliary Bishop of Brooklyn

References

Source and External links 
 GigaCatholic, with titular incumbent biography links

Communes of Jijel Province